Valery Vladimirovich Polekh  (July 5, 1918 – September 6, 2006) was a Soviet horn player. The horn concerto Op.91 by Reinhold Glière was dedicated to him.

External links
IHS article written by Polekh himself describing his experience with the Glière concerto
Article about Polekh's career
IHS bio
WindSong Press Bio

1918 births
2006 deaths